Richard Dawson (born 12 April 1967) is an English former professional footballer who played as a goalkeeper for Grimsby Town.

Career
Dawson was born in Sheffield and began his career with Stoke City. He failed to break into the first team at Stoke and joined Second Division side Grimsby Town in 1984 where he made one appearance which came in a 0–0 draw away at Leeds United on 9 February 1985.

Career statistics
Source:

References

1967 births
Living people
Footballers from Sheffield
English footballers
Association football goalkeepers
Stoke City F.C. players
Grimsby Town F.C. players
Gainsborough Trinity F.C. players
English Football League players